Squadron Leader Alexander Campbell Shirreff (12 February 1919 – 16 December 2006), known as Alan Shirreff, was an English pilot who served in the Royal Air Force during the after the Second World War. Shirreff was also an amateur cricketer who played first-class cricket either side of the Second World War. He played as an all-rounder, taking over 300 wickets with his medium pace deliveries.

Early life
Shirreff was born at Ealing in Middlesex in 1919. He was educated at Dulwich College where he played cricket in the school XI as well as playing for the Public Schools team. As a schoolboy he was described as one of the "best bowlers" in Public Schools cricket in 1938 and as a "tower of strength" for Dulwich. He captained Dulwich in 1937 and 1938.

He went up to Cambridge University in 1939, making his first-class cricket debut for Cambridge University Cricket Club against Northamptonshire as a freshman, going on to win his Blue the same year. Shirreff played 12 matches for the university, all in 1939, his University career interrupted by the start of the Second World War.

Service career
Shirreff joined the Royal Air Force during the war. He served in No. 19 Squadron of the Royal Air Force, flying North American P-51 Mustang fighter planes over Norway from RAF Peterhead in Scotland.

After the war Shirreff continued to serve in the RAF, rising to the rank of Squadron Leader. He played cricket for RAF and Combined Services sides until 1963, captaining the RAF side.

Cricket career
Shirreff played for Surrey Second XI in the summer of 1939, making five appearances in the Minor Counties Championship during the university long vacation. After the war he played for Combined Services, the Royal Air Force and Hampshire County Cricket Club during 1946. He played 12 times for Hampshire in 1946 and 1947, making his County Championship debut against Surrey.

Shirreff played 40 times in first-class matches for Combined Services between 1946 and 1957 and continued to play for the side until 1963. He joined Kent County Cricket Club in 1950, playing 46 first-class matches from 1950 to 1956. He played infrequently in county matches due to his RAF career, although he won his county cap in 1952.

Shirreff coached Somerset for a brief time, making two first-class appearances for the county in 1958 as well as playing regularly for the Second XI. He left the county after falling out with Somerset captain Maurice Tremlett.

Shirreff also made four first-class appearances for MCC and two for Free Foresters.

Later life
Shirreff died at West Wickham in Bromley in December 2006 aged 87.

References

External links

1919 births
2006 deaths
People from Ealing
Military personnel from London
People educated at Dulwich College
English cricketers
Cambridge University cricketers
Combined Services cricketers
Royal Air Force cricketers
Hampshire cricketers
Marylebone Cricket Club cricketers
Free Foresters cricketers
Kent cricketers
Somerset cricketers
Royal Air Force personnel of World War II
Royal Air Force officers
Alumni of the University of Cambridge